James McClatchy (1824–1883) was an American newspaper editor. He was the second editor of The Sacramento Bee, which grew into The McClatchy Company, taking over just days after the newspaper began publication as The Daily Bee in February 1857.

Life and career
Born in 1824 in Ireland, McClatchy was a young journalist on the editorial staff of Horace Greeley’s New York Tribune in 1848, when news of a gold strike on Northern California's American River reached the East. Taking the advice of his employer, who famously declared "Go west, young man," McClatchy went west.

After an arduous journey that included a shipwreck in Baja California, McClatchy reached the gold fields of the Sierra Nevada. His short-lived endeavor at mining, however, brought him no wealth.

He married Charlotte Maria McCormick (1829–1916) and had at least four children: Fannie, Emily Estelle, Charles Kenny and Valentine Stuart McClatchy.

Returning to  journalism, he took a position in the summer of 1849 with the Placer Times, which was published at Sutter's Fort, the settlement that gave rise to the river port town of Sacramento, California. As an editorialist, McClatchy developed a reputation as a people's champion after he took a stand against land speculators in what would evolve into the 1850 Squatters' Riot.

By fall of the next year, McClatchy was editing his own Settlers and Miners Tribune, which survived only a few weeks. He moved on to work for the Sacramento Transcript, the Democratic State Journal and the Sacramento Times before joining founder Rollin Ridge at the fledgling Sacramento Bee. Less than a week after the new paper appeared in 1857, McClatchy had become its editor. That same week, The Bee reported a scandal that led to the impeachment of California State Treasurer Henry Bates.

Known as a supporter of the people's interests against those of corporations and corrupt politicians, McClatchy made The Bee a bastion of progressive reformism. Upon his death in 1883, the paper's leadership passed to James's sons, Charles and Valentine.

External links
 The California Newspaper Hall of Fame

1824 births
1883 deaths
McClatchy people
19th-century American newspaper publishers (people)
19th-century American journalists
American male journalists
19th-century American male writers